Sepulkas, also renditioned as sepulcas, and called scrupts in English translation, are unclearly defined fictional objects found in works of Polish science fiction writer Stanisław Lem, The Star Diaries and Observation on the Spot. A fictional encyclopedia lists them as "objects used for sepuling".

In-universe sepulkas
Sepulkas were first mentioned by Lem's interstellar traveller Ijon Tichy in his fourteenth voyage. It is, however, never explained what they actually are and what their use is.

The Encyclopaedia Cosmica gives the following definitions on the subject:

Sepulka – pl.: sepulkas, a prominent element of the civilization of Ardrites from the planet of Enteropia; see "Sepulkaria"
Sepulkaria – sing: sepulkarium, establishments used for sepuling; see "Sepuling"
Sepuling – an activity of Ardrites from the planet of Enteropia; see "Sepulka"

Although omnipresent in art and commercials of the alien civilisation Tichy visits, discussions of sepulkas is a major taboo and all of Tichy's attempts to learn about them are seen by the locals as a faux pas. Eventually Ijon Tichy decides to simply purchase a sepulka, but when asked by a clerk where his wife is he admits he's a bachelor, the clerk and other customers are shocked and appalled by his attempt and Tichy is forced to leave the premises.

In the Observation on the Spot it was revealed that the planet Enteropia in fact did not exist and was but a camouflage for the planet Entia, and all speculations about sepulkas and their "pornosphericity" must be dismissed. It was also revealed there that Encyclopaedia Cosmica was a hoax.

The last work of Lem, a 2005 essay "Głosy z sieci" ("Voices from the Net"), contained answers to questions of Russian internet users to Lem. Two users wrote that since their childhood they had been bothered with the question what sepulkas are and what's up with their pornosphericity. Lem's answer was, "Well, I have no idea myself."

A comparative review of two new Russian biographies of Lem (published in 2014 and 2015) ends with the remark that both lemologists did not answer what sepulkas were.

"The Fourteenth Voyage" of Tichy was rendered as an animation film in the Soviet Union in 1985. Produced by Azerbaijanfilm in Russian language, this 10-minute film was titled From the Diaries of Ijon Tichy. A Voyage to Enteropia. In the film, Tichy manages to acquire a sepulkas (an egg-shaped object), but when he tries to board his spaceship (piloted by his friend, professor Tarantoga), he is hit by a meteorite, the plague of Enteropia, and at that moment it is revealed that the purchased egg-shaped object kept his double, the standard remedy against the meteorite kills on Enteropia.

Legacy
In 1983-1985, the Polish Union of Fans of Science Fiction (Polskie Stowarzyszenie Miłośników Fantastyki) issued the award Golden Sepulka (pl) for works of science fiction.

Sepulcidae is a family of extinct hymenopteran insects found in 1968 in Transbaikalia. It was identified by Alexandr Pavlovich Rasnitsyn and named by his colleague and science-fiction author Kirill Eskov.<ref> Каракоз Роман. Где живут сепульки: [О двух видах палеонтологических перепончатокрылых — Sepulka mirabilis и Sepulenia syricta] // Новая интересная газета (Киев). — 2004. — № 1. — С. 5. — (Блок Z: Просто фантастика). Annotation
Quote: Оказывается, сепулек, которые оказались вовсе не моллюсками, а перепончатокрылыми насекомыми, открыл Александр Павлович Расницын (кстати, работающий в одной лаборатории с известным писателем Кириллом Еськовым). Он-то и посылал в свое время Лему свою книжку, где, кроме прочего, были описаны Сепулька удивительная (Sepulca mirabilis) и Сепуление со свистом (дословно – свистящее: Sepulenia syricta).</ref>  See also Sepulca, Sepulenia.

In 1972 Russian paleontologist Nina Shevyryova (Нина Семёновна Шевырёва (1931-1996)  described an extinct rodent Sepulkomys eboretus'' ("eboretus" is another bow to Lem: "eboret" is a type of public transport on the planet Enteropia visited by Tichy in his "Fourteenth Voyage").

In 2007 Wojciech Orliński published a book "Co to są sepulki? Wszystko o Lemie" ("What are Sepulki? Everything about Lem").

Notes

References

Stanisław Lem
Fictional objects
Words originating in fiction